Molla Kandi may refer to:
 Molla Kandi, Ardabil
 Molla Kandi, Miandoab, West Azerbaijan Province
 Molla Kandi, Poldasht, West Azerbaijan Province